William Herbert Higginbottom JP (23 March 1868 – 6 December 1929) was an architect based in Nottingham.

Life

He was born on 23 March 1868 in Leeds to Anthony Higginbottom (1842–1895) and Elizabeth Ackroyd (1844–1913). When he was one year of age, his family moved to Arnold, Nottingham, where his father became the headmaster of the British School.

He married Elizabeth Spencer (1869–1924) on 25 January 1897 at Redcliffe Road Methodist Chapel, Nottingham, and they had the following children:
Hilda Margaret Higginbottom (1899–1973)
William Herbert Higginbottom (1899–1899)
(Anthony) John Higginbottom (1902–1972) LRIBA also an architect
Elizabeth May Higginbottom (1904–1904)
Elizabeth Higginbottom (1906–1972)

He died on 6 December 1929 and left an estate valued at £2882 16s 2d..

Career
He attended the Nottingham School of Art.

For a time he worked from King John's Chambers in Nottingham. In 1905 he moved to an office at 16 George Street, Nottingham but in 1906 he moved to 2 Friar Yard, Friar Lane, Nottingham. along with Hedley John Price.

After qualifying as an architect Higginbottom designed many of the important buildings in Arnold.

He was a local councillor on Arnold Urban District Council and chairman from 1911 to 1913. He was a member of Nottinghamshire County Council, for the Bestwood Park Division, where he worked on the old age pension and highways committees.

Buildings

St Matthias' Day Schools, Carlton Road, Sneinton, Nottingham 1895 (enlargement) 
Stapleford Schools 1896
Sir John Robinson’s Almshouses, Daybrook 1899 
Wesleyan Chapel, Arnold 1900
Carlton Methodist Church, 1903 
Five semi-detached houses, 44-62 Meadow Road, Beeston
United Methodist Church, Sneinton Boulevard, Sneinton 1904-05 
The Carnegie Library, Arnold 1906 
Calverton Methodist Church, 1907 
Cross Street Baptist Church 1909 
St Albans Picturedrome, Arnold 1912 (with George Francis Grimwood)
Daybrook Baptist Church, 1912 
Ruddington Village Hall 1912-13
Victoria Picture Palace, 49 Station Road, Carlton 1912-13
Empress Cinema, Arnold 1913
Mission Church at Daybrook 
War Memorial Cross, Beeston 1921 
War Memorial in Arnot Hill Park, Arnold 1922
Chilwell Memorial Institute 1924
Park House Carlton
Warehouses on Plumptre Street, Nottingham
Sunday School, Ebenezer United Methodist Chapel, Arnold 1929

References

1868 births
1929 deaths
Members of Nottinghamshire County Council
People from Arnold, Nottinghamshire
Architects from Nottingham